Jordan Garcia-Calvete (born 6 May 1992) is a Belgian footballer who plays as a midfielder.

Career
Garcia-Calverte was loaned to De Graafschap on 1 January for the remainder of the 2011–12 Eredivisie season from R.S.C. Anderlecht after having been previously on loan with K. Sint-Truidense V.V. He made his debut in the 2–0 loss to SC Heerenveen on 21 January as a second-half substitute.

He played for FC Ganshoren from 2016, before leaving the club in 2020 after the club reached promotion to the Belgian Division 2.

Personal life
Born in Brussels, Garcia-Calvete is of Spanish descent and holds a Spanish passport.

References

External links
 Voetbal International profile 
 
 

1992 births
Living people
Footballers from Brussels
Association football midfielders
Belgian footballers
Belgian people of Spanish descent
Belgian expatriate footballers
R.S.C. Anderlecht players
Sint-Truidense V.V. players
Belgian Pro League players
De Graafschap players
Eredivisie players
Belgian expatriate sportspeople in the Netherlands
Expatriate footballers in the Netherlands